

See also
 List of ISO 639-3 language codes (2019)
 List of ISO 639-3 language codes used locally by Linguist List

ISO 639